Pinafore Moraine is a sheet of moraine which extends northeastward from Carapace Nunatak, in Oates Land. Reconnoitered by the New Zealand Antarctic Research Program (NZARP) Allan Hills Expedition (1964). The name is descriptive.

Moraines of Antarctica
Landforms of Oates Land